Anne Wilson (born February 21, 2002) is an American Christian musician and songwriter. Wilson made her debut in 2021, with the release of the single "My Jesus" through Capitol Christian Music Group. "My Jesus" was Wilson's breakthrough hit, having reached number one on Billboard's Hot Christian Songs chart and Bubbling Under Hot 100 chart. Wilson also released her debut extended play, My Jesus (Live in Nashville) (2021), which reached number twelve on the Top Christian Albums Chart in the United States.

Early life
Anne Wilson was born in Lexington, Kentucky. Wilson was raised in a Christian home, and attended a Presbyterian church throughout most of her childhood.

Career
Anne Wilson signed a record deal with Capitol Christian Music Group in late 2019. On April 16, 2021, Wilson released "My Jesus" as her debut single. "My Jesus" went on to become Wilson's breakthrough hit single, peaking at number one on the Hot Christian Songs chart, and the Christian Airplay chart. "My Jesus" was nominated for the Billboard Music Award for Top Christian Song at the 2022 Billboard Music Awards. On August 6, 2021, Wilson released her debut extended play titled My Jesus (Live in Nashville). The EP reached its peak at number twelve on the Top Christian Albums Chart in the United States. Wilson released "I Still Believe in Christmas" on October 29, 2021. "I Still Believe in Christmas" peaked at number 15 on the Hot Christian Songs chart. Billboard named Anne Wilson the Top New Christian Artist of 2021.

On January 14, 2022, Wilson released the single "Sunday Sermons". The song peaked at number five on the Hot Christian Songs chart. Anne Wilson released her debut studio album, My Jesus, on April 22, 2022, My Jesus debuted at number one on the Top Christian Albums chart, and number 68 on the Billboard 200 chart in the United States, after garnering 13,000 equivalent album units in sales in its first week. On August 26, 2022, Anne Wilson featured on the single "Behold" by Phil Wickham. "Behold" peaked at number eight on the Hot Christian Songs chart. Anne Wilson released "Hey Girl" as the third single from My Jesus to Christian radio in the United States on September 16, 2022. "Hey Girl" peaked at number 26 on the Hot Christian Songs chart.

Discography

Studio albums

EPs

Singles

As lead artist

As featured artist

Promotional singles

As lead artist

As featured artist

Other charted songs

Bibliography

Tours
Supporting
 Big Daddy Weave - All Things New Tour  (2021)
 Zach Williams - I Don't Want Christmas To End Tour (2021)
 Matthew West - Brand New Tour (2022)
 Zach Williams - Spring '22 Tour (2022)
 Crowder - My People Tour (2022)
 Casting Crowns - Healer Tour (2022)
 Phil Wickham - Behold Christmas Nights (2022)

Awards and nominations

American Music Awards

!Ref.
|-
| 2022
| Anne Wilson
| Favorite Inspirational Artist
| 
| 
|-
|}

Billboard Music Awards

!Ref.
|-
| 2022
| "My Jesus"
| Top Christian Song
| 
| 
|-
|}

GMA Dove Awards

!
|-
| rowspan="6" | 2022
| rowspan="2" | "My Jesus"
| Song of the Year
| 
| rowspan="6" | 
|-
| Pop/Contemporary Recorded Song of the Year
| 
|-
| rowspan="2" | Anne Wilson
| Songwriter of the Year - Artist
| 
|-
| New Artist of the Year
| 
|-
| "Mamas"
| Bluegrass/Country/Roots Recorded Song of the Year
| 
|-	
| My Jesus 
| Pop/Contemporary Album of the Year
| 
|-
|}

Grammy Awards

!
|- 
| 2023
| My Jesus
| Best Contemporary Christian Music Album
| 
| 
|-
|}

References

External links
 
  on AllMusic

2002 births
Living people
American women singer-songwriters
American performers of Christian music
Composers of Christian music
Musicians from Lexington, Kentucky
21st-century American women singers
21st-century American singers
Christians from Kentucky
Singer-songwriters from Kentucky